Pippa Hayward (born 23 May 1990) is a New Zealand field hockey player who has represented her country.

Hayward competed in the 2015 Women's FIH Hockey World League Final, 2015 Oceania Cup and represented New Zealand at the 2016 Summer Olympics.

Hayward studied law and arts at the University of Auckland, and was admitted to the bar in 2018. She is a member of the Sports Tribunal of New Zealand.

References

External links
 

New Zealand female field hockey players
Field hockey players at the 2016 Summer Olympics
Olympic field hockey players of New Zealand
1990 births
Living people
Sportspeople from Dunedin
Commonwealth Games gold medallists for New Zealand
Field hockey players at the 2018 Commonwealth Games
Commonwealth Games medallists in field hockey
21st-century New Zealand lawyers
20th-century New Zealand women
21st-century New Zealand women
Medallists at the 2018 Commonwealth Games